Seelow is a German town, seat of the Märkisch-Oderland, a district of Brandenburg. As of 2013 its population was of 5,464.

Geography
It is situated in the extreme east of Germany, 70 km (40 miles) east of Berlin, 16 km (10 miles) west of the border with Poland.

History

The village appears in the records held in 1252 by Archbishop Wilbrand of Magdeburg. At that time, listed as Villa Zelou, it was included in the property of the formerly Polish Bishopric of Lebus (Lubusz Land), contested between the Magdeburg archbishops and the Ascanian margraves of Brandenburg.

Seelow suffered damaging town fires in 1630, 1788 and again in 1809.

In 1863 the district council office was relocated to Seelow and in 1950 "Lebus district" was renamed "Seelow district"; following frontier changes agreed with the Soviet Union in 1945, the town of Lebus itself had lost to Poland much of the agricultural area that had traditionally supported it. Between 1952 and 1993, Seelow was the administrative centre for the  within the larger Frankfurt territory.

Seelow was the location of one of the last major pitched battles in Europe during the Second World War - the Battle of the Seelow Heights. In this battle, from 16 to 19 April 1945, Soviet troops under Marshal Zhukov opened the way to Berlin. By the time the slaughter was over the town was largely destroyed, primarily through a major air attack which took place on 17 April 1945, and which was followed by extensive burning and plunder.

Cultural references
Because of its importance in the Second World War, Seelow is today featured in many video games, books and films. Seelow is a playable map in the popular video game Call of Duty: World at War. The Battle of the Seelow Heights is featured extensively in Men of War. The planet Тзаэло (Tzaelow) in the Warhammer 40,000 universe is a likely reference to the town of Seelow, particularly the way that the battle is fought.

Demography

Twin towns – sister cities

Seelow is twinned with:

 Moers, Germany (1990)
 Kostrzyn nad Odrą, Poland (1998)
 Międzychód, Poland (1998)
 Nangis, France (1998)

See also
Seelow Heights
Battle of the Seelow Heights

References

External links

 
Localities in Märkisch-Oderland